There are three sporting events known as the Madrid Open:

 Madrid Open (golf), a men's golf tournament played from 1968–2007, except 1994–2000
 WTA Madrid Open (tennis), a women's tennis event played from 1996–2003
 Madrid Open (tennis), a current tennis tournament for both men and women